(born June 6, 1968) is a Japanese actor known in the west for his performances in tokusatsu media.

Filmography

Film

Television

References

Sources
 

1968 births
Japanese male film actors
Living people
Place of birth missing (living people)
Male motion capture actors